The Commissioner of Police, Bangalore City is the head of the Bangalore City Police. Founded in July 1963, the post has been held by 32 officers of the Indian Police Service (IPS), the first of whom was C. Chandy. The average length of tenure is 1 year, 8 months; Bangalore's longest-serving Police Commissioner is P. G. Halarnkar, who held office for 3 years, 9 months in the mid-1980s. The current incumbent is Pratap Reddy, who has held office since May 2022.

Past Commissioners

See also
 Commissioner of Police, Delhi
 Police Commissioner of Mumbai
 Police Commissioner of Kolkata

References

Bangalore
Indian police chiefs
Karnataka Police